A supreme administrative court is the highest court in a country with jurisdiction over lower administrative courts and the administrative decisions of the authorities, but not the legislative decisions (laws) made by the government (which are under the jurisdiction of a constitutional court). For a specific country, see:

Supreme Administrative Court of Austria
Supreme Administrative Court ("Council of State") of Belgium
Supreme Administrative Court of Bulgaria
Supreme Administrative Court of the Republic of China
Supreme Administrative Court of the Czech Republic
Supreme Administrative Court of Finland
Supreme Administrative Court ("Council of State") of France
Federal Administrative Court of Germany
Supreme Administrative Court ("Council of State") of Italy
Supreme Administrative Court of Lithuania
Federal Administrative Court of Switzerland
Administrative Court of Iran
Supreme Administrative Court of Poland
Supreme Administrative Court of Portugal
Supreme Administrative Court of Sweden
Supreme Administrative Court of Thailand
Supreme Administrative Court ("Council of State") of Turkey
Council of State (Greece)